Kingsford Adjei (born 21 January 1999) is a Ghanaian footballer who plays as a winger for South Georgia Tormenta in the USL League One.

Career

Youth
Adjei played with the Right to Dream Academy in Ghana for five years, where he was named the Academy Student of the Year.

College & amateur
In 2016, Adjei moved to the United Kingdom to attend Hartpury College and played non-league football with Westfields while studying.

In 2018, Adjei moved to the United States to play college soccer at Quincy University. In his freshman season, he scored nine goals and tallied two assists for the Hawks in 18 appearances. Adjei transferred to the University of Dayton in 2019, going on to make 36 appearances with the Flyers, scoring 21 goals and adding 12 assists to his name. He was named Midfielder of the Year twice for the Atlantic 10 Conference and made the A-10 First Team in three consecutive seasons.

In 2019, Adjei played with National Premier Soccer League club Asheville City SC, making a single appearance. and also with USL League Two side Dayton Dutch Lions later in the summer. During the 2021 season, Adjei appeared for USL League Two side Des Moines Menace, scoring five goals in six games, helping the team to win the USL League Two Championship.

Professional
On 11 January 2022, Adjei was selected 56th-overall in the 2022 MLS SuperDraft by New York City FC. On 18 February 2022, Adjei signed his first professional deal, joining USL League One club South Georgia Tormenta ahead of their 2022 season. He made his professional debut on 2 April 2022, starting in a 1–0 loss to North Carolina FC.

Honors

Club
Des Moines Menace
USL League Two: 2021

References

External links
 
 Profile at Tormenta FC

1999 births
Living people
Association football wingers
Dayton Dutch Lions players
Dayton Flyers men's soccer players
Des Moines Menace players
Expatriate footballers in England
Expatriate soccer players in the United States
Ghanaian footballers
Ghanaian expatriate footballers
Ghanaian expatriate sportspeople in England
Ghanaian expatriate sportspeople in the United States
National Premier Soccer League players
New York City FC draft picks
Quincy Hawks men's soccer players
Right to Dream Academy players
Footballers from Accra
Tormenta FC players
USL League One players
USL League Two players
Westfields F.C. players